The Future Awards Africa (previously known as The Future Awards) are a set of awards given by The Future Project, a social enterprise communications firm affiliated to Red Africa. The awards are intended to celebrate young people between the ages of 18 and 31, who have made outstanding achievement in the year under consideration. Forbes has described the awards as "Nigeria’s most important awards for outstanding young Nigerians".

The idea for the awards was conceived by Chude Jideonwo, Adebola Williams, and Emilia Asim-Ita in 2005.

History
The Future Awards Africa first event was on February 6, 2006, at Magnolia Hall, City Mall, Lagos. The venue changes and the 2011 event was at the Landmark Events Centre, Victoria Island, Lagos. Since 2012, it has been held at the Altec Azcum in Port Harcourt, Rivers State. 2013's edition was hosted by on-air personality Toke Makinwa and rapper Vector.

In 2013, the name of the awards was changed to The Future Awards Africa to reflect a partnership with the African Union.

Categories, nomination, judging and awards
The awards are given to winners in diverse categories, including the Young Person of the Year category. Some of the categories are:

The Future Awards Africa Prize in Advocacy
The Future Awards Africa Prize in Agriculture
The Future Awards Africa Prize for Arts (Visual and Applied)
The Future Awards Africa Prize for Acting
The Future Awards Africa Prize for Business
The Future Awards Africa Prize for Community Action
The Future Awards Africa Prize for Content Creation
The Future Awards Africa Prize for Education
The Future Awards Africa Prize for Entrepreneurship
The Future Awards Africa Prize for Fashion
The Future Awards Africa Prize for Filmmaking
The Future Awards Africa Prize for Health and Wellness
The Future Awards Africa Prize for Journalism
The Future Awards Africa Prize for Literature
The Future Awards Africa Prize for Media
The Future Awards Africa Prize for Movements
The Future Awards Africa Prize for Music
The Future Awards Africa Prize for On-Air Personality (Visual & Audio)
The Future Awards Africa Prize for Photography
The Future Awards Africa Prize for Professional Service
The Future Awards Africa Prize for Public Service
The Future Awards Africa Prize for Sports
The Future Awards Africa Prize for Technology
The Future Awards Africa Prize for Young Person of the Year

Nomination results are usually announced to the public in late January.

There is a four-stage, three-month-long judging process involving a board of judges and an audit committee. Judges come from all over Africa. The judges include Mfonobong Nsehe, Belinda Otas (assistant editor, New African Woman), Brenda Wendo (deputy features editor, The Star newspaper, Kenya), Billie Adwoa McTernan (Ghana correspondent, The Africa Report), Adam Bouhadma (editor, 9rayti.com, Morocco), and Michelle Atagana (managing editor, Memeburn).

The audit committee includes Katja Schiller Nwator (Leadership Development and CSR Manager, The Tony Elumelu Foundation), Mahamadou Sy (founder and executive director of the Institut Supérieur de Développement Local (ISDL), Senegal), Wendy Luhabe (author), Abiola Alabi (MD, MNet Africa), Tonye Cole (executive director, Sahara Group), Ndidi Nwuneli (founder, LEAP Africa), Mo Abudu (CEO, EbonyLife TV), Gbenga Sesan (founder, Paradigm Initiative Nigeria), Eikem Nutifafa (founding partner, Oxford and Beaumont, Ghana), Chi-Chi Okonjo (publisher, Ventures Africa), Victoria Trabosh (founder, Ithafari Foundation), Taa Wongbe (managing partner The Khana Group), Ayo Ajayi (MD, PATH Global) and Jennah Scott (director, Liberia Philanthropy Secretariat, Office of the President).

The awards are presented at a live televised ceremony that is also streamed on the internet, most commonly in February or March following the relevant calendar year, and six weeks after the announcement of the final shortlist of nominees.

Young Person of the Year Award
Winners of the Young Person of the Year award include Tanzanian entrepreneur Ashish Thakkar, malaria scientist Ify Aniebo, writer Chimamanda Adichie, NASA scholar Tosin Otitoju, and agriculture entrepreneur and advocate Nnaemekan Ikegwuonu.

Criticism
The awards have drawn criticism regarding the ages of the nominees. In December 2011, Chude Jideonwo said: "We certainly have had more than a few complaints about the ages of one or two nominees... Over the years we have had to withdraw the nominations of a few nominees who have been unable to prove their actual ages..."

The awards have a two-week complaint period, within which the public can email complaints about any nominee to the Central Working Committee about the age or the substance of the achievement of the nominees.

In 2009, an email exchange between a dancer and a former winner of the award, Qudus Onikeku and Chude, leaked on the Sahara Reporters, as the former sought to clarify comments he had made about the Young Person of the Year Award given to D'banj, in the year after his win, against the backdrop of the musician's controversial video for "Suddenly."

Awards
The Future Awards Africa won the Event of the Year award at the first The Nigerian Event Awards (TNEA), in May 2011.

In February 2013, its founders, Chude Jideonwo and Adebola Williams, were both named in Forbes 30 Under 30: Africa's Best Young Entrepreneurs.

References

External links

The Future Project

Nigerian awards